The 1991 IIHF Asian Oceanic Junior U18 Championship was the eighth edition of the IIHF Asian Oceanic Junior U18 Championship. It took place between 3 and 9 March 1991 in Jilin, China. The tournament was won by Japan, who claimed their sixth title by finishing first in the standings. China and North Korea finished second and third respectively.

Standings

Fixtures
Reference

References

External links
International Ice Hockey Federation

IIHF Asian Oceanic U18 Championships
Asian
International ice hockey competitions hosted by China